{{DISPLAYTITLE:C16H18O2}}
The molecular formula C16H18O2 (molar mass: 242.31 g/mol, exact mass: 242.1307 u) may refer to:

 rac-Butestrol
 meso-Butestrol

Molecular formulas